Lau Ah Kok or Lau Gim Kok (1920 – 7 January 2018) was a Bruneian businessman of Chinese descent who was known for establishing Hua Ho, a well-known local supermarket and department store chain as well as an agricultural farm in Brunei.

Life and career 
Lau Ah Kok was born in 1920 in Kinmen to a farmers' family and in the early years he lived with his family in Kinmen. During the Second World War, he left his hometown at the age of 17 and eventually migrated to Brunei, where he worked at a grocery shop owned by his brother-in-law. The destruction in the aftermath of the war also prevented him from returning to his homeland.

In 1947, he set up in Manggis a small agricultural farm and the first Hua Ho store, which was a grocery store. However, after a few years he had to close the store due to financial difficulty as well as illness. It was revived in 1961 but again ceased operation in 1982, this time together with the farm, citing bankruptcy.

Nevertheless, he was undeterred and after acquiring sufficient capital he established a supermarket in Gadong as well as the first Hua Ho department store in Lambak. He also revived the farming business where he set up new farms in Junjongan in 1984 and Labi four years later, in which he made substantial investment in machinery and better farming methods. He then decided to relinquish the retail business to his children where he could focus on the farming business. Nevertheless, both businesses finally took hold and become successful. The department store eventually became the largest retail business in the country with nine stores altogether located in Brunei-Muara and Tutong Districts, where as the farms generated substantial produce – it produces about 10,000 tonnes of oranges annually, sells 1,000 broiler chicken per hour and seven tonnes of vegetables; all are supplied to the Hua Ho supermarket stores.

Awards and honours

Honours 
In 2004, Lau Ah Kok was granted, by the Sultan of Brunei Sultan Hassanal Bolkiah, the titular position of Manteri, a class of nobility (similar to the British life peerage), with the title  for his contributions to the local Chinese community and government activities. He was one of the few local Chinese commoners in the nobility. Two years later, he was also awarded by the Sultan a service medal which came with the title .

 Order of Seri Paduka Mahkota Brunei Second Class (DPMB) – Dato Paduka (15 July 2006)

Awards 
In 2008, he was awarded the Asia-Pacific Entrepreneurship Lifetime Achievement Award by Enterprise Asia, a Kuala Lumpur-based organisation, for his business achievements locally.

Death 
Lau Ah Kok died on 7 January 2018 at his residence in Manggis, at the age of 98. He was survived by his wife, seven children, fifteen grandchildren and two great-grandchildren.

References 

1920 births
2018 deaths
Bruneian people of Chinese descent
Bruneian businesspeople
Chinese emigrants